In geometry, a rhombic hectotriadiohedron, rhombhectotriadiohedron or rhombic 132-hedron is a polyhedron composed of 132 rhombic faces. Rhombic faces have 5 positions within octahedral symmetry. There are two topological types, with the same number of elements, the same symmetry, but having a somewhat different arrangement of rhombic faces.

The type T has 8 rhombi meeting at the center positions of a cube's 6 faces. 3 meet at the 8 corners of a cube. 12 are positioned along the 12 edges of a cube, and 4 more surround each of 12 edges of a cube. It is a 12-zone zonohedrification of the rhombicuboctahedron.

Type C is a 12-zone zonohedrification of a truncated cube.

See also
 Trigonal trapezohedron - 6 rhombi
 Rhombic dodecahedron - 12 rhombi
 Rhombic triacontahedron - 30 rhombi
 Rhombic hexecontahedron - 60 rhombi
 Rhombic enneacontahedron - 90 rhombi

References

 George Hart
zono-12 from rhombicubocahedron VRML model
zono-12 from truncated cube VRML model
 Rhombic Polyhedron with 132 Faces
 rhombic 132-hedron within a cube

Zonohedra